Edmund Heines (21 July 1897 – 30 June 1934) was a German Nazi politician and Deputy to Ernst Röhm, the Stabschef of the Sturmabteilung (SA). Heines was one of the earliest members of the Nazi Party and a leading member of the SA in Munich, participating in the Beer Hall Putsch and becoming a notorious enforcer of the party. He held several high-ranking positions in the Nazi administration until he was executed during the Night of the Long Knives in June 1934.

Early life
Edmund Heines was born on 21 July 1897 in Munich, the illegitimate child of Helene Martha Heines and Lieutenant Edmund von Parish, a native of Hamburg from a merchant family for whom she was a nanny. In 1903, Martha Heines gave birth to a second child, Oskar Heines, who is also believed to have been fathered by Parish. In 1915, Heines joined the Bavarian Army to fight in World War I after graduating from his Gymnasium, and fought on the Western Front as a field artillery operator. Heines suffered a serious head wound in late 1915, earned the Iron Cross 1st Class and 2nd Class, and was discharged as a Leutnant in 1918.

Political career
After the war, Heines became involved in the Freikorps movement. From 1919 to December, 1922, Heines served as leader of a unit in Freikorps Roßbach  that fought in West Prussia and the Baltic States under Gerhard Roßbach. In March 1920, Heines participated in the Kapp Putsch, and relocated to the Mecklenburg-Pomerania area after the coup's failure like most participating Freikorps Roßbach members. In July 1920, Heines was involved in the murder of Willi Schmidt, a 20-year-old farm worker who allegedly wanted to reveal hidden arms caches of the Freikorps. Heines returned to Munich following Schmidt's murder, and in 1922 became Führer of the Munich Ortsgruppe, the local Freikorps Roßbach group. In December 1922, Heines became Member #78 of the National Socialist German Workers' Party (NSDAP), and transferred the Ortsgruppe to the Sturmabteilung (SA), the paramilitary wing of the party. Heines was appointed leader of the Second Battalion in the Munich SA Regiment and soon became one of the SA's leading members. In November 1923, Heines was one of two thousand Nazi that participated in the Beer Hall Putsch, being assigned to take the Hotel Vierjahreszeiten. Heines was sentenced to 15 months imprisonment for his part in the failed coup d'etat and was held, together in the same cell with Adolf Hitler, at Landsberg Prison. Heines was released prematurely in September 1924 while the SA and NSDAP were both still banned, taking over the leadership of the Second Battalion of the Munich Frontbann Regiment until 1925 when he joined the re-legalized SA and NSDAP. From 1925 to August 1926, Heines was federal director of the Schilljugend, a right-wing youth organization founded by Gerhard Roßbach now affiliated with the SA and NSDAP. In 1926, Heines enrolled in Erlangen University to study law, and became a Standartenführer of the SA.

On 22 January 1928, Heines was arrested in Schongau for his involvement in Willi Schmidt's murder in 1920, which was exposed during a blackmail attempt. Heines was transferred to Stettin as the main defendant in the trial for Schmidt's murder. The prosecution demanded the death penalty for Schmidt's murder, but the judgement of the Stettin court was 15 years in prison for manslaughter, later lowered to 5 years. On 15 June 1928, the NSDAP deputy Wilhelm Frick referred to Heines's conviction in a Reichstag speech as "Outflow of infernal Jewish hatred of the front spirit, against the spirit of national resistance." On 14 May 1929 Heines was released from custody by a decision of the Stettin court for a "bail" of 5000 Reichsmarks. In 1929, Heines was also convicted of the murder of communist Conrad Pietrzuch, who had been beaten to death by an SA gang led by Heines. The trial had to be reopened due to a technical error, and Heines soon received an amnesty because of his supposedly "patriotic" motive.

Heines held numerous prominent political positions concurrently with his SA positions. From August 1929 to June 1930 he was the SA-Führer of Standarte X in Munich, the Nazi Party headquarters. He was also an Ortsgruppenleiter (Local District Leader) in the Munich Party organization and served as the Adjutant to Gauleiter Adolf Wagner. From May to August 1930 he was the Gau Propaganda Leader in Gau Groß-Munich under Wagner. From June to November 1930, he was additionally appointed as Acting Gauleiter of Gau Oberpfalz, the Upper Palatinate region of Bavaria. Then in November, he became a staff member in the News and Press Department of the Obersten SA-Führung (Supreme SA Leadership) serving there until April 1931. In September 1930, Heines was elected to the Reichstag for electoral district 8 (Liegnitz) and remained a Reichstag deputy until his death.

Deputy to Ernst Röhm

On 1 May 1931, Heines was appointed Deputy to SA-Stabschef Ernst Röhm, the effective commander of the SA and a close friend of Hitler. Then in July 1931, Heines also became SA-Führer of SA-Gruppe Silesia. After the Nazi seizure of power, Heines was appointed Polizeipräsident (Police President) in Breslau on 25 March 1933. He was also named Deputy Gauleiter to Helmuth Brückner in Gau Silesia. In addition, he became the Special Plenipotentiary to Silesia of the SA Supreme Leadership. In April, he secured a position on the Prussian State Council. On 20 April 1933 he was promoted to SA-Obergruppenführer. In July 1933 he became SA-Führer of the new SA-Obergruppe III with oversight of three SA Gruppe, namely, Berlin-Brandenburg, Ostmark and Silesia. On 15 March 1934, Silesia was raised to the status of an Obergruppe (VIII) and Heines remained in charge. Now at the height of his power, Heines would hold all these posts until his death. 

In early 1933, the establishment of Nazi Germany led to Hitler, now with access to the state apparatus including the Reichswehr, no longer requiring or desiring the street fighting antics of the SA, and seeking to marginalize the organization. Röhm was one of the most powerful men in Nazi Germany as de facto commander of the SA, and considered by Hitler to be one of few people who posed a threat to his leadership. Hitler already had a personal aversion to Heines who, as Röhm's loyal Deputy, was perceived as a threat by extension.

Death
On 30 June 1934, Heines and many other SA leaders were executed shortly after their arrest during the Night of the Long Knives. Hitler identified Heines as one of the principal members of a "small group of elements which were held together through a like disposition" in his Reichstag speech of 13 July 1934. Heines and five others were executed by a firing squad convened by Sepp Dietrich. In 1957, Dietrich was sentenced to 18 months in prison by a West German court for his role in the executions of Heines and the other men.

Heines's younger brother, Oskar, was an Obersturmbannführer of the SA, and on the morning of 1 July 1934, he heard a radio report concerning the execution of his brother. Soon after, Oskar Heines and SA-Obersturmbannführer Werner Engels, reported to the Polizeipräsidium in Breslau, where they were immediately placed under arrest by SS men. From there, they were driven that night to a forested area near Deutsch-Lissa (now Wrocław-Leśnica, Poland). At dawn on 2 July 1934, the two were shot on orders of SS-Obergruppenführer Udo von Woyrsch.

Character and attributes
Heines had developed a reputation for brutality as an enforcer of the SA, known for personally killing political opponents of the NSDAP despite his high-ranking status. In his diaries, Joseph Goebbels described Heines as "an unbalanced person, full of storm and urge, a child's head", attributing his violent nature to his background. Contemporary sources often pointed out Heines as being unusually tall and powerfully built but with a contradictory youthful, boyish face.

Homosexuality
Heines was an open homosexual, as were Röhm and several other leading members of the SA. On 12 May 1932, Heines had been arrested for assaulting Helmuth Klotz, a publicist and former NSDAP member who had defected to the Social Democratic Party, for which Heines was suspended from the Reichstag. Klotz had published letters from Ernst Röhm that addressed his homosexuality in March 1932. The Social Democratic Party's newspaper, the Münchener Post, publicized Heines as belonging to Röhm's homosexual circle of friends. Hitler had tolerated the prevalence of open homosexuals in the SA leadership despite ideological opposition to homosexuality and the public embarrassment to the party. However, Heines' homosexuality later proved to be convenient for Hitler during the upcoming purge of SA leaders, as it could tie him and others to the "Röhm Putsch", a fictional coup d'etat plot of the SA.

Awards and decorations
1914 Iron Cross 2nd Class, 11.03.1916
1914 Iron Cross 1st Class, 1916
Military Merit Order (Bavaria) 3rd Class with Crown and Swords, 11.05.1917
Military Merit Order (Bavaria) 4th Class with Swords, 05.07.1918
1918 Wound Badge, 1918
Tiwaz (rune), c.1932
Honour Chevron for the Old Guard, February 1934

Notes

External links

References

 

 

1897 births
1934 deaths
German murderers
Gauleiters
Gay politicians
Kapp Putsch participants
LGBT people in the Nazi Party
German LGBT politicians
German people convicted of manslaughter
Members of the Reichstag of the Weimar Republic
Members of the Reichstag of Nazi Germany
Nazis executed by Nazi Germany
Nazis executed by firing squad
Nazi Party officials
Nazi Party politicians
Nazi propagandists
Nazis who participated in the Beer Hall Putsch
People executed by Nazi Germany by firing squad
People from Bavaria executed by Nazi Germany
People from the Kingdom of Bavaria
Politicians from Munich
Recipients of the Iron Cross (1914), 1st class
Recipients of the Iron Cross (1914), 2nd class
Sturmabteilung officers
20th-century Freikorps personnel
Victims of the Night of the Long Knives
German Army personnel of World War I
20th-century German LGBT people
Gay military personnel